Cyperus retrorsus, commonly called pine barren flatsedge, is a species of flowering plant in the sedge family (Cyperaceae). It is found primarily in the Southeastern United States, with a range extending north to Martha's Vineyard, Massachusetts and south to Tamaulipas, Mexico. Its natural habitat is in dry sandy soils, in open woodlands and thickets.

Cyperus retrorsus is a tufted perennial, growing to around 50 cm tall. Its fruits mature in the summer. It is similar to the closely related C. echinatus, from which C. retrorsus can be distinguished by its cylindrical inflorescence and shorter stature.

See also 
 List of Cyperus species

References

retrorsus
Flora of North America
Taxa named by Alvan Wentworth Chapman